This is a list of election results for the electoral district of Todd in South Australian elections.

Members for Todd

Election results

Elections in the 1980s

 Todd became a notionally Labor held seat in the redistribution.

Elections in the 1970s

References

South Australian state electoral results by district